The 2016 WAFL season was the 132nd season of the various incarnations of the West Australian Football League (WAFL). Peel won the match by 23 points, recording their first ever premiership.

Ladder

Finals series

Elimination and Qualifying Finals

Semi-finals

Preliminary final

Grand Final

References 

West Australian Football League seasons
WAFL